Ivano Trotta (born 12 December 1977 in Rome), is an Italian football manager and former player, who played as a central midfielder.

Career
Trotta began his career with Juventus during the 1996–97 Serie A season, and played for several other Italian clubs in Serie B and Serie C, namely Fiorenzuola, Carrarese, Viterbese, Padova, Gualdo, Rimini, Napoli, Treviso. He later played for Ravenna Calcio in Lega Pro Prima Divisione during the 2008–09 season, and ended his career with Bellaria Igea Marina after the 2009–10 Lega Pro Seconda Divisione season.

Career statistics

Club

External links
 Profile at tuttocalciatori.net
 Profile at AIC
 Profile at FIGC

References

Italian footballers
Italy youth international footballers
Serie A players
Serie B players
Serie C players
Treviso F.B.C. 1993 players
Ravenna F.C. players
S.S.C. Napoli players
Rimini F.C. 1912 players
Calcio Padova players
Carrarese Calcio players
U.S. Fiorenzuola 1922 S.S. players
Juventus F.C. players
1977 births
Living people
Association football midfielders